The 1861 United States Senate election in Pennsylvania was held on January 8, 1861. Edgar Cowan was elected by the Pennsylvania General Assembly to the United States Senate.

Results
Incumbent Democrat William Bigler, who was elected in 1856, was not a candidate for re-election to another term. The Pennsylvania General Assembly, consisting of the House of Representatives and the Senate, convened on January 8, 1861, to elect a new Senator to fill the term beginning on March 4, 1861. The results of the vote of both houses combined are as follows:

|-
|-bgcolor="#EEEEEE"
| colspan="3" align="right" | Totals
| align="right" | 133
| align="right" | 100.00%
|}

References

External links
Pennsylvania Election Statistics: 1682-2006 from the Wilkes University Election Statistics Project

See also 
 United States Senate elections, 1860 and 1861
 United States Senate special election in Pennsylvania, 1861

1861
Pennsylvania
United States Senate
January 1861 events